John Wyllie Goldie (10 October 1889 – 26 February 1958) was a Scottish footballer who played as a centre half or right half.

He began his career with junior club Hurlford Thistle before moving to England with Fulham of the Football League Second Division, where he briefly played alongside older brother Bill (another brother, Archie, was also a professional). A move to Glossop in 1911 led to move playing time, and he soon moved on to Bury. During World War I, when official English competitions were halted but the Scottish Football League continued, Goldie was loaned to Kilmarnock. At that time there were also two other locally-born players named Goldie at Killie, Alex and George, who were brothers but not closely related to Jack's family.

He returned to Bury when the English league restarted in 1919–20, then signed for Kilmarnock on a permanent basis. In 1922 he was loaned to Clyde purely to play in the Glasgow Cup final. His career was brought to an end in 1923 (although he was already 33 by that stage) when he was implicated in a match fixing scandal from three years earlier when it was found Bury had accepted payments from Coventry City  to prevent the latter's relegation, and Goldie was banned for life along with several others.

See also
 Match fixing in English football

References

1889 births
1958 deaths
Fulham F.C. players
Glossop North End A.F.C. players
Bury F.C. players
Kilmarnock F.C. players
Clyde F.C. players
Scottish footballers
Association football wing halves
Association football central defenders
Footballers from East Ayrshire
Scottish Junior Football Association players
English Football League players
Scottish Football League players